Black Cube (BC Strategy Ltd) is a private intelligence agency based in London, Tel Aviv and Madrid, which drew widespread condemnation for its work surveilling and assisting with efforts to slander the reputations of women accusing Harvey Weinstein of sexual violence and journalists reporting on them.
The company was founded in 2010 by former Israeli intelligence officers Dan Zorella (in Hebrew: דן זורלא) and Avi Yanus (in Hebrew: אבי ינוס). Its employees include former members of Israeli intelligence units. Often, it has supported Israeli Defense Forces (IDF) activities.

Black Cube provides intelligence, evidence, and advisory services in multi-jurisdictional legal and white collar crime cases. Its clients include primarily very high net worth individuals, oligarchs and corporations around the world, about whom Black Cube exposed fraud, bribery, money laundering, corruption and asset dissipation. The company uncovered high-level corruption in Italy, Panama, and Mexico. It is estimated that Black Cube managed to trace and recover billions of dollars in hidden assets around the world.

Black Cube's tactics have resulted in a number of international controversies. In Romania, two of its employees were convicted of criminal charges involving harassment and hacking.

History
BC Strategy Ltd. ( Black Cube)  has offices in Tel Aviv, London, and Paris. It was founded in 2010 by Avi Yanus who was an Israel Defense Forces (IDF) strategic planning officer and Dan Zorella, who was in IDF Military Intelligence. Yanus and Zorella met at the Technion University in Haifa, where they both did undergraduate studies in economics and Yanus then completed his PhD in organizational behavior. By 2018, Black Cube had been involved in operations in over sixty countries.

Since 2011, Black Cube has provided evidence for high-profile cases in Canada, Italy, Israel, Mexico, Panama, the United Kingdom and the United States. The company describes itself as a "select group of veterans from the Israeli elite intelligence units that specialises in tailored solutions to complex business and litigation challenges."

Black Cube's International Advisory Board includes Meir Dagan,  a former chief of Mossad—Israel's national intelligence agency—from 2002 to 2011, and Black Cube's president. Their IAB includes Efraim Halevy, who was also a head of Mossad for 30 years. Other IAB members include Yohanan Danino, Giora Eiland, Adrian Leppard, Robert Amaee, Asher Tishler, Paul Reyniers, Golan Malka, and Itiel Maayan.

In a court deposition Yanus described the bilateral relationship between the IDF and Black Cube's civilian market, where former Israeli intelligence operators advise Black Cube and provide it with a business network. According to Forbes Israel, Black Cube is one of many business intelligence firms such as GPW, and K2,  that expanded by 80 billion dollars in 2015 alone. These intelligence firms attract people who previously worked IDF's Military Intelligence. Salaries are high in the business intelligence sector. Dozens of these firms were established as the demand grew. Forbes Israel called this a "new trend in Israeli exports."

Media coverage

In 2014, Israel's Globes published a favorable article about Black Cube after they won several high-profile cases. In their 2018 article, Forbes Israel called Black Cube the "Mossad" of the "business world".

Black Cube has been criticized by the international press. In his November 6, 2017 The New Yorker article, Ronan Farrow described them as an "army of spies" who attempted to stifle stories about Harvey Weinstein's sexual assaults by seeking to discredit the women Weinstein attacked and the journalists who investigated his crimes. A lengthy June 2021 report in the Canadian newspaper, the Globe and Mail—one in a series of articles that were highly critical of its methods—detailed the many ways Black Cube agents worked to fabricate evidence against innocent civilians, including a Canadian judge and journalists. In August 2021, the podcast Darknet Diaries featured a first-hand account of Black Cube operatives targeting journalists and Citizen Lab staff member John Scott-Railton. In his 2021 publication, Spooked: The Trump Dossier, Black Cube, and the Rise of Private Spies, former investigative reporter with The New York Times, Barry Meier, described the "oversized impact" Black Cube and other private spies in their "murky world"—were "suddenly having on politics, business and our personal lives."

Notable investigations and clients

Vincent Tchenguiz 
The first case that brought Black Cube to the attention of the media, was the legal dispute between Vincent Tchenguiz, a major donor to the Conservative Party (UK) and an investor in the SCL Group and the UK Serious Fraud Office (SFO). Tchenguiz first hired Black Cube in 2011, following his arrest on March 10, 2011, as part of the SFO investigation into the collapse of the Icelandic bank Kaupthing. and continued to use their services on a number of cases. Black Cube analysed the network of relationships surrounding the collapse of the bank, and helped build a successful challenge to the SFO arrests and search warrants, causing the judge to declare the SFO's actions unlawful in 2013. Tchenguiz's lawsuit against Black Cube, alleging fraudulent invoices, was dropped in an undisclosed settlement agreement.

Nochi Dankner 
In 2014, Black Cube was hired by Israeli businessman Nochi Dankner, to examine a court decision assigning control of IDB Holding Corp. Ltd. to Motti Ben Moshe. Black Cube investigated the sources of capital of Ben Moshe, revealing an ongoing investigation by German regulatory authorities into Ben Moshe's company ExtraEnergy, and locating a witness who held evidence of money laundering and tax evasion by Ben Moshe.

Joseph Kabila  
In 2019, the Israeli investigative television program Uvda (which airs on channel 12) released a report detailing how Dan Zorella had met with then-president of the Democratic Republic of the Congo, Joseph Kabila in 2015 to hire Black Cube for Operation Coltan, an operation to spy on Kabila's political opponents. Black Cube investigators rented out the entire floor of a hotel in Kinshasa to serve as a base of operations. Opposition figures expressed outrage at the revelations.

Nobu Su 
In 2015, Black Cube assisted Taiwanese businessman Nobu Su, owner of the shipping company TMT, in his efforts to gain permission to appeal a 2014 judgement in favor of Lakatamia Shipping in which Su was found personally liable for the amount of almost $47m. Black Cube delivered intelligence to Su's legal team showing that 20% of the judgement amount was due to a company called Slagen Shipping, which had ceased operations at the time of the establishment of the claim, thereby rendering it unable to act as a claimant, both reducing the quantum of the judgement significantly, and causing the appeal to be granted.

Kfar Giladi Quarries 
Black Cube was hired to assist Kfar Giladi Quarries in their highly publicized dispute with Caesarstone in Israel. Black Cube engaged a Caesarstone engineer in conversation during a group bicycle trip in Kfar Giladi. In the recording, the engineer contradicted the allegations that were made by Caesarstone in the arbitration proceeding with Kfar Giladi. After six years of deliberations, Judge Boaz Okun ordered Caesarstone to pay more than $14m as compensation to Kfar Giladi.

AmTrust Financial Services  
In 2016, Black Cube was involved in exposing bribery and corruption in a set of Italian arbitrations between AmTrust and an Italian named Antonio Somma totaling €2bn. Somma admitted to the company's undercover agents that he could control the arbitration panels, and that he had an agreement to pay the chair of the arbitration panel 10% of any money they awarded him. Following Black Cube's findings, the arbitrator was dismissed and in July 2016, the two sides reached a settlement on the total of 60 million euros instead of the initial 2 billion euro claim.

Rami Levy Hashikma Marketing 
In 2016, Black Cube was hired by Rami Levy, the owner of Rami Levy Chain Stores Hashikma Marketing who is considered a champion of low prices in Israel, to verify his suspicions that he was being targeted by a rival chain in a negative media campaign. Black Cube provided Levy with evidence that the PR agent who worked for Levy's competitor, Victory supermarket chain, exposed the negative campaign that they carried out aimed at damaging Levy's public reputation. Levy later used those materials in a lawsuit against his competitor.

Alstom and Afcon 
In 2016, France's Alstom and its Israeli partner Afcon hired Black Cube to assist them with their dispute against the Israel Railways' electrification bid, which the Spanish company SEMI won. Black Cube presented recordings of officials from the Israel Railway discussing malfunctions that occurred in the bid. Based on these findings in January 2018, the Superior Court in Israel issued an agreement of compromise according to which the work on the railway will be divided between all three of the companies and that Black Cube's clients' work will be priced at 580 million NIS, after they originally lost the bid.

Harvey Weinstein 
In 2017, Black Cube made headlines after it was revealed that in 2016 the film executive Harvey Weinstein had hired private investigators—including Kroll and Black Cube—with its highly trained "former Mossad agents"— in his efforts to suppress allegations by numerous women that he had sexually harassed or assaulted them. In his July 2016 contract with Black Cube, Weinstein clarified that the explicit goal of the investigation was to stop the abuse allegations from surfacing. In his November 6, 2017 The New Yorker article, entitled "Harvey Weinstein’s Army of Spies", Ronan Farrow described in detail how Black Cube agents tracked and met journalists and actresses. They focused in particular on Rose McGowan, who later publicly accused Weinstein of rape. Over the course of a year, Black Cube and other agencies, "target, or collect information on, dozens of individuals, and compile psychological profiles that sometimes focused on their personal or sexual histories." One agent, Stella Penn Pechanac, used an alias to pose as a women's rights supporter interested in hiring McGowan for a formal dinner speech, enabling her to secretly record conversations with the actress. Black Cube apologized for taking the case in November 2017. , Manhattan federal prosecutors investigating Weinstein were probing into the firm's activities on his behalf, and McGowan's separate racketeering suit against it remained active. During Weinstein's 2020 trial for assault in Manhattan, Black Cube's spying on behalf of Weinstein was entered into evidence in January. In November 2017, Black Cube set up a fake recruitment firm, and flew an employee and a former employee of a hedge fund company to London for fake job interviews, in order to gain proprietary information about the hedge fund, according to The New York Times. Black Cube refused to comment. In New York State, private investigators are required to be licensed, but the Times could not find a record of a license for Black Cube or B.C. Strategy.

Gefen Biomed 
In 2017, Gefen Biomed filed a NIS 60 million lawsuit which claims that entrepreneurs Moshe (Mori) Arkin and others deliberately misled or deceived minority shareholders in biomed company cCam Biotherapeutics. The lawsuit is based on evidence collected by Black Cube, which conducted recorded interviews with key figures in cCam that prove a deliberate and systematic attempt to conceal exit talks with Merck for up to $625 million.

Iran Nuclear Deal 
In 2017 aides to U.S. President Donald Trump had contracted with Black Cube in order to undermine the Iran Nuclear Deal by discrediting former Obama administration officials Colin Kahl and Ben Rhodes. They looked for evidence of unsubstantiated and false claims that Kahl and Rhodes were being enriched by Iran lobbyists and that they were cheating on their spouses. The goal was to seek damaging information about former Obama administration officials and help the Trump administration undermine the Iran nuclear deal. Black Cube claimed in response that it had no relation to the Trump administration, to Trump aides, or to the Iran nuclear deal. In August 2018, The New Yorker connected Black Cube's research to a memo circulated in the Trump White House in early 2017 alleging former Obama officials 'conspired with reporters' "to undermine President Trump's foreign policy" in hopes of saving Obamacare and the Iran nuclear deal. In October 2018, Haaretz newspaper revealed that Black Cube's activities were aimed at tracking transfers of Iranian funds and assets in order to seize them, following US court rulings against Iran in favor of victims of terror attacks. Furthermore, it was published that the goal of the intelligence gathering was tracing unknown Iranian assets and revealing Obama's administration collaboration with Iran, in violation of US or international law, in order to find other possible parties to sue such as banks.

Project Maple Tree - Project Camouflage 
A detailed June 12, 2021 report in Toronto, Canada's Globe and Mail described Black Cube's "Bay Street sting that went bust" as "Project Camouflage". It was revealed in Ontario provincial court documents that Black Cube's client Toronto-based private-equity firm Catalyst owned by Newton Glassman had paid about $CDN 11 million to Black Cube for an effort code-named 'Project Maple Tree' to "embarrass" and improperly discredit Ontario Justice Frank Newbould. Catalyst Capital Group and West Face Capital had been involved in a lengthy and multi-pronged legal battle after West Face acquired WIND Mobile, a Canadian wireless provider in 2014. In his August 18, 2016  Ontario Superior Court of Justice decision, Justice Newbould ruled against Catalyst in favor of West Face, and said that Catalyst's owner, Newton Glassman was "aggressive," "argumentative" and "considerably difficult." Justice Newbould awarded West Face $1,239,965, saying that Glassman was "certainly playing hardball attacking the reputation and honesty of West Face" because he had lost the opportunity to acquire Wind. In retaliation, Glassman hired Black Cube, to dispatch agents to discredit Newbould and West Face, according to a March 31, 2021 Wall Street Journal article. Through this story, Black Cube received coverage in Canadian media.

Bank Hapoalim 
In 2018, Black Cube was hired by Bank Hapoalim to trace the assets of Motti Zisser, who left behind a high debt to the bank. Black Cube provided intelligence of Zisser having a number of assets in Europe which were transferred from him to his son David through a sophisticated network of shell companies. As a result of the intelligence gathered by Black Cube, Bank Hapoalim was granted an injunction that applied an effective freeze on all the companies of the Zisser Family, which resulted in a settlement of the Zisser family returning 95 million NIS to the bank.

Viktor Orban's re-election
In 2018, Black Cube supported Viktor Orban's re-election campaign gaining taped telephone conversations of individuals associated with George Soros who was actively opposing Orban's re-election. According to Tamar Zandberg, Hungary was “carrying out an anti-Semitic campaign against Soros”, and Benjamin Netanyahu, whose Likud party, she stated, has dangerous ties to "extreme right-wing parties in Europe", openly supported Orban's anti-Semitic re-election campaign. She stated that Black Cube's support for Orban is an "Israeli embarrassment."

Janio Lescure and Judge Oydén Ortega 
In 2019, Black Cube uncovered proof of bribery and corruption between lawyer Janio Lescure of Panama and various judges and magistrates in the country, including Judge Oydén Ortega of the Supreme Court. Black Cube was able to procure audios of Lescure admitting his close relationships with judges, state officials, and mafiosos as well as his ability to control court verdicts, bypass inspections of illegal activities, and avoiding paying taxes.

NSO Group  
In October 2018, Associated Press reported that two University of Toronto cybersecurity researchers were being pursued by undercover operatives with false identities who were inquiring about the researchers' work concerning the Israeli spyware company NSO Group. The operatives also appeared to be trying to goad the researchers into making anti-Semitic or otherwise damaging remarks. After a sting operation organised by one of the researchers and the AP, one operative was photographed and later identified as a former Israeli security official who had previously worked on a case linked to Black Cube. Responding to the revelation, NSO Group denied contracting Black Cube, and Black Cube likewise denied involvement.

In February 2019, Associated Press reported that at least four more individuals - three lawyers, and one journalist - were pursued by undercover operatives for their work on NSO. Undercover agents again tried to goad the individuals into making racist or anti-Israel remarks. Channel 12, an Israeli television channel, obtained and aired the secret recordings made by the undercover operatives shortly before the AP published the revelations. Channel 12 confirmed that Black Cube undercover investigators were involved, and claimed the individuals being investigated by Black Cube were attempting to smear NSO Group on behalf of Qatar. At the time, Black Cube declined to comment besides a generic reply that it follows the law in all jurisdictions it operates in. An April 2022 article in The New Yorker included more denials from both NSO and Black Cube but included a quote from NSO chief Hulio Shalev that contradicted those denials:

“NSO Group has denied hiring Black Cube to target opponents. However, Hulio acknowledged the connection to me, saying, “For the lawsuit in Cyprus, there was one involvement of Black Cube,” because the lawsuit “came from nowhere, and I want to understand.””

Eliezer Fishman 
In 2019, Black Cube exposed Eliezer Fishman's hidden assets valued at around €100 million. Fishman, once considered one of Israel's wealthiest businessmen, was declared bankrupt in 2016. Black Cube secretly recorded several meetings with associates of Fishman, which led the London High Court to rule that the businessman had illicitly hidden assets and properties across Europe, mainly Germany, through legal entities, trustees, and representatives.

Beny Steinmetz
In May 2020, Black Cube submitted on behalf of Beny Steinmetz evidence to a New York court that the Brazilian company Vale SA withheld critical information concerning a mining license in Guinea obtained by Steinmetz. During a four-month operation, Black Cube gathered recordings with Vale senior executives, who admitted that Vale assumed the mining license was obtained illegally when they entered into the contract, contradicting an arbitration award of $1.8 billion in favor of Vale.

Petróleos Mexicanos
In October 2019, it was revealed that Black Cube recorded evidence of bribery and corruption of senior officials at Mexico's Petróleos Mexicanos, known as Pemex. The recordings were submitted as part of a lawsuit filed in 2018 by Oro Negro, a Mexican oil-field drilling company, claiming that Pemex drove Oro Negro into bankruptcy when the company refused to pay bribes. Black Cube recordings offer evidence of long-standing corruption in Mexico's largest state enterprise, in all levels of Pemex management up to the CEO and board. This evidence was additionally presented to the DOJ in their investigation into Pemex.

Controversies

Laura Codruța Kövesi 
In April 2016, two of the company employees were arrested, and later convicted, in Bucharest on suspicions of spying, phishing, and cyberharassing the chief prosecutor of the Romanian National Anticorruption Directorate, Laura Codruța Kövesi, and people close to her. After sentencing, the company reached an understanding with the Romanian authorities and the two employees were released and returned to Israel after a few months. At the time of the arrest, Black Cube denied any wrongdoing, saying that they were working under contract from the highest political powers in Bucharest and that "all of Black Cube’s employees follow local law to the letter, and the allegations against them are unfounded and untrue".

Hungarian election campaign
Between December 2017 and February 2018 Black Cube set up a cover company called Smart Innotech, seated in London, UK, and contacted Hungarian Migration Aid Hungary by email, urging them to have a meeting in Vienna, Austria. Migration Aid contacted the Hungarian foreign intelligence (Alkotmányvédelmi Hivatal) and recorded and tightly controlled the meetings. Black Cube attempted to collect data on migrants, and on Hungarian opposition party members, to uncover alleged ties with George Soros; which were proven to be false. Black Cube failed to gather any information; the company—which was never registered—disappeared after February.
Black Cube used the same methods with multiple NGOs, like Open Society Foundations Hungary and the Hungarian Helsinki Committee.

Russia probe
On 5 April 2019 the Senate Intelligence Committee sent a letter to Walter Soriano, the owner of USG Security Limited based in Britain and Israel, requesting his communications with Paul Manafort, Michael Flynn, Psy-Group, Wikistrat, Orbis Business Intelligence (a firm co-founded by Christopher Steele), and Black Cube. In response, the company denied any connection and stated that “neither they nor anyone acting on their behalf has ever had any communication or collaboration with Walter Soriano or anyone on his behalf."

International Advisory Board
 Meir Dagan (Deceased) – Former head of Mossad, Honorary President of the Board.
Efraim Halevy – Former head of Mossad, headed the National Security Council and the Hebrew University Center for Strategic Studies.
Yohanan Danino – Former Israeli Police Commissioner, served as Chairman of Migdal Insurance Group.
 Major General Giora Eiland – Former head of the Israeli National Security Council, headed the IDF's Operation Branch and IDF's Planning Branch.
 Robert Amaee – Former Head of Anti-Corruption, Proceeds of Crime and International Assistance at the Serious Fraud Office (SFO).
Professor Asher Tishler – President of the College of Management Academic Studies
 Brigadier General Mati Leshem – Recipient of the 1997 Israel Defense Prize
 Paul Reyniers – Former partner at Price Waterhouse and author of GARP (Generally Accepted Risk Principles)
 Itiel Maayan – Member of Microsoft's Customer Advisory Board
 Lieutenant Colonel Golan Malka – Former Vice President Marketing and Business Development of NICE Systems

References

Sources

External links
 

Israeli companies established in 2010
Business intelligence companies
Companies based in Tel Aviv
Business services companies established in 2010
Private detectives and investigators
Private intelligence agencies